Asuroides sagenaria, the crossed footman, is a moth of the family Erebidae. It was described by Wallengren in 1860. It is found in the Democratic Republic of Congo, Mozambique, South Africa, Tanzania, Uganda, Zambia and Zimbabwe.

The larvae feed on lichens and Cinnamomum zeylanicum.

References

External links
Images of the types in the Swedish Museum of Natural History

Nudariina
Lepidoptera of the Democratic Republic of the Congo
Lepidoptera of Mozambique
Lepidoptera of South Africa
Lepidoptera of Tanzania
Lepidoptera of Zambia
Lepidoptera of Zimbabwe
Moths of Sub-Saharan Africa
Moths described in 1860